Piero Gherardi (20 November 1909 – 8 June 1971) was the Costume and Set Designer of Federico Fellini's La Dolce Vita and 8½, winning an Oscar for each film in the category of Best Costume Design.

Born in Poppi, Tuscany, Piero Gherardi began his artistic collaboration with Fellini during the 1953 production of I vitelloni. The director recognized his talent for scouting locations and extras and his deep knowledge of the region of Lazio. Gherardi soon proved his skills in set design by building Cabiria's shack in Fellini's Le notti di Cabiria (1957).

Gherardi had studied to become an architect but started working in film production in Italy, in the late 1940s.

Beside his two Academy Awards, he was nominated an additional four times: three times for the  Academy Award for Best Production Design for La Dolce Vita, 8½ and Juliet of the Spirits and another in the category of Costume Design for Juliet of the Spirits.

Before his death in Rome in 1971, Gherardi had mastered numerous roles as Costume Designer, Production Designer, Art Director, and Set Decorator.

Selected filmography
 Prelude to Madness (1948)
 Alarm Bells (1949)
 Her Favourite Husband (1950)
 La Dolce Vita (1960)
 Juliet of the Spirits (1965)

References

External links

1909 births
1971 deaths
Best Costume Design Academy Award winners
Italian scenic designers